Podarcis liolepis, the Columbretes wall lizard or Catalan wall lizard, is very similar to the other lizards in the genus Podarcis. This species was formerly described as a subspecies of the Iberian wall lizard, but has now been elevated to species status. These are slender lizards with long tails, narrow tapered heads and long thin toes, and stout legs. Colours are variable, although generally grey-brown. Often very subtle spots and stripes along the back and flanks can be seen and these can be more distinguished in the female. The underside is a much lighter cream or beige with sometimes a reddish tint. Adults grow 15–20 cm in length from the nose to tip of the tail. Body length can be a little as one third of the total body length, the tail making up the other two thirds.

Life cycle 
Lifespan around 4–5 years. Sexual maturity is reached in their second year. Breeding takes place in spring after they wake from winter hibernation. 1-5 eggs are laid, each around 9x15mm, in cracks in rocks or under stones. During development the eggs swell and after 8 weeks when ready to hatch they can be 8x15mm in size. They hatch out around early July.

Distribution 
They are found in the north-east of the Iberian peninsula, including southern France in parts of the Pyrenees. They are not found above 3400m elevation.

References

liolepis
Reptiles described in 1905
Reptiles of Europe
Taxa named by George Albert Boulenger